Natasha Salifyanji Kaoma (born 1992) is a Zambian medical doctor, best known for being the founder of Copper Rose Zambia with Faith Suwilanji Kaoma an organisation seeking to teach women the importance of sexual and reproductive health. She is a women's health advocate and the 2017 Queen's Young Leaders Award winner. She is a member of the Royal Commonwealth Society for her work in improving the lives of Commonwealth citizens and was also nominated for the Nelson Mandela-Graca Machel youth activism award in 2016.

Awards
Natasha is a 2017 Queens Young Leaders award recipient and Zambian Women of the Year-Healthcare Champion for 2017.

Personal life
Natasha springs from a family which is mainly dominated by females, her being the sixth child. She has a brother who happens to be the only male member of the family. Altogether, they are seven in the family.

References

External links

1992 births
Living people
Zambian physicians
Women physicians
University of Zambia alumni
Zambian women